William Bulkeley Hughes J.P. (26 July 17978 March 1882) was a Welsh politician who sat in the House of Commons from 1837 to 1859 and 1865 to 1882. He was elected for Member of Parliament for Carnarvon Boroughs constituency.

Hughes was the eldest son of Sir William Bulkeley Hughes of Plas Coch, Llanidan, Anglesey and Elizabeth, of Coed Alun, Caernarfon. He was educated at Harrow School and called to the bar at Lincoln's Inn in 1824.

Public life
As a prospector in railway shares, Bulkeley-Hughes made significant gains in the 1840s. In 1850, Bulkeley-Hughes had organised a banquet for Robert Stephenson to commemorate the opening of the Britannia Bridge. Bulkeley-Hughes was the chairperson of the Anglesey Central Railway from its founding until it was absorbed by the London and North Western Railway in 1876. As a politician, Bulkeley-Hughes was Justice of the peace of Anglesey and Caernarvonshire, and became sheriff of Anglesey in 1861.

Politics
Bulkeley-Hughes was initially elected as a Conservative of Caernarfon (UK Parliament constituency) in 1837, during the election, Bulkeley-Hughes contested against and beat Charles Paget (Royal Navy officer), brother of the Marquess of Anglesey. For nearly 40 years he was M.P. in parliament with a short hiatus between 18591865. Bulkeley-Hughes was re-elected as MP for Carnarvon Boroughs as a Liberal in 1865 and held the seat until his death in 1882, and aged 85 "was in point of age the 'father' of the House of Commons". He is buried in the churchyard of St Edwen's Church, Llanedwen, Anglesey.

In 1846 Bulkeley-Hughes sided with the pro-Free Trade wing of the party led by Sir Robert Peel who became known as the Peelites. Hughes appears to have left the Peelites by 1859 as he stood as a 'Liberal' in the 1859 general election but lost to a Conservative. A few weeks later the Peelites merged with Radicals and Whigs to create the Liberal Party.

Family
Hughes married first Elizabeth Wormald, daughter of Jonathan Nettleship of Mattersey Abbey near Bawtry and widow of Harry Wormald in 1825. He married second Elizabeth Donkin, daughter of William Donkin, in 1866. His only child, Lady Sarah Elizabeth  married Charles Hunter-Hughes in 1876, who became the Baronet of Plâs Côch of the Hughes family estate in Llanedwen, Anglesey, north Wales.

References

External links 

 

1797 births
1882 deaths
Members of Lincoln's Inn
UK MPs 1837–1841
UK MPs 1841–1847
UK MPs 1847–1852
UK MPs 1852–1857
UK MPs 1857–1859
UK MPs 1865–1868
UK MPs 1868–1874
UK MPs 1874–1880
UK MPs 1880–1885
Liberal Party (UK) MPs for Welsh constituencies
Conservative Party (UK) MPs for Welsh constituencies
High Sheriffs of Anglesey
Deputy Lieutenants of Anglesey
Deputy Lieutenants of Caernarvonshire
Members of Parliament for Caernarfon
People educated at Harrow School